Kerugan or Korugan may refer to:
 Korugan, Kerman
 Kerugan, Markazi